The Chihuahuan mouse (Peromyscus polius) is a species of rodent in the family Cricetidae.

It is found only in Mexico.

References 

 Musser, G. G. and M. D. Carleton. 2005. Superfamily Muroidea. pp. 894–1531 in Mammal Species of the World a Taxonomic and Geographic Reference. D. E. Wilson and D. M. Reeder eds. Johns Hopkins University Press, Baltimore.

Peromyscus
Endemic mammals of Mexico
Mouse, Chihuahuan
Natural history of Chihuahua (state)
Mammals described in 1904
Fauna of the Sierra Madre Occidental
Taxonomy articles created by Polbot